Qeshlaq-e Baqersoli may refer to:
Qeshlaq-e Baqersoli Ali Sahami
Qeshlaq-e Baqersoli Hajj Khan Ali
Qeshlaq-e Baqersoli Satar